Joseph Hadley may refer to:

Joseph William Hadley (1819–1898), Canadian ship captain
Joe Hadley, American boxer
Jozuf Hadley, pen name Bradajo (born 1932), American poet and artist
Joseph Hadley, English miller, party to Hadley v Baxendale